Union Township is one of seventeen townships in Boone County, Iowa, USA.  As of the 2000 census, its population was 503.

History
Union Township was organized in 1856, by Judge John B. Montgomery.

Geography
According to the USGS, it contains two cemeteries: Fairview and Moore.

References

External links
 US-Counties.com
 City-Data.com

Townships in Boone County, Iowa
Townships in Iowa
1856 establishments in Iowa